Spirillum winogradskyi is a gram-negative, bacterium from the genus of Spirillum which was isolated from the sulfidic sludge of a municipal wastewater treatment plant.

References

External links
Type strain of Spirillum winogradskyi at BacDive -  the Bacterial Diversity Metadatabase

Nitrosomonadales
Bacteria described in 2009